Narava is a neighborhood situated on the western part of Visakhapatnam City, India. The area, which falls under the local administrative limits of Greater Visakhapatnam Municipal Corporation, is about 11 km from the Gajuwaka which is industrial area in the city. there are so many engineering and polytechnic colleges are located hear. APSRTC is providing 400S & 6B city bus routes to this area .

Transport
APSRTC buses are available here.

APSRTC routes

References

Neighbourhoods in Visakhapatnam